The men's football tournament at the 1985 South Asian Games was held from 21 to 25 December 1985 in Dhaka, Bangladesh. Nepal was the defending champion.

India won the tournament by defeating Bangladesh in the final.

Participating nations

Fixtures and results

Group A

Group B

Bronze medal match

Gold medal match

Winners

References

1985 South Asian Games
1985 South Asian Games